Charles Henry Hardin (July 15, 1820 – July 29, 1892) was an American attorney and politician who was one of the eight founders of Beta Theta Pi fraternity. He served as the 22nd Governor of Missouri from 1875 to 1877 and previously served in the Missouri Senate and the Missouri House of Representatives.

Biography
In 1820, Charles Henry Hardin was born to Charles and Hannah Jewell Hardin in Trimble County, Kentucky. Shortly after, the family moved to Missouri and eventually settled in Columbia. Following his father's death in 1830, Hardin worked in the family's tannery business.

Hardin began his secondary education in 1837 at the Indiana University Bloomington. He transferred to Miami University in 1839 and graduated in 1841. During his time at Miami University, he helped to found Beta Theta Pi fraternity.  Following graduation, he studied law with James M. Gordon in Columbia, MO, passed the bar, and opened a practice in Fulton, Missouri in 1843. Hardin married Mary Bar Jenkins in 1844.

He began public service in 1848 as an attorney for the Second Judicial Circuit, and then served in the Missouri House of Representatives. In 1860, he was elected to the Missouri Senate. As state senator, he attended Claiborne Fox Jackson's secessionist meeting in Neosho, Missouri, and was the only senator present to vote against secession. During the war, he returned to the family farm in Audrain County, Missouri. Hardin and his family moved to Mexico, Missouri, where he established a new law practice and co-founded Mexico Southern Bank, following the close of the war.

In 1872, Hardin was again voted to the state senate. He served as 22nd Governor of Missouri between 1875 and 1877. During his term, Hardin reduced Missouri's debt from the Civil War and state funding for railroad expansion by ending wasteful practices and refinancing bonds.  He was a Democrat.

Hardin was a founder and board chair of Hardin College. He died in 1892 in Mexico, Missouri. He was initially buried in a private graveyard in Audrain County, Missouri, but was later re-buried at the Jewell family cemetery in Columbia, Missouri.

Charles H. Hardin is the namesake of the small city of Hardin, Missouri.

References

 Brown, James T., ed., Catalogue of Beta Theta Pi, New York: 1917.

External links
 

1820 births
1892 deaths
Democratic Party governors of Missouri
Miami University alumni
People from Trimble County, Kentucky
Beta Theta Pi founders
19th-century American politicians
Burials at Jewell Cemetery (Columbia, Missouri)